Zotino is the name of several rural localities in Russia:
Zorino, Astrakhan Oblast, a selo in Limansky District of Astrakhan Oblast
Zotino, Chelyabinsk Oblast, a selo in Bagaryaksky Selsoviet of Kaslinsky District of Chelyabinsk Oblast
Zotino, Krasnoyarsk Krai, a selo in Zotinsky Selsoviet of Turukhansky District of Krasnoyarsk Krai
Zotino, Kurgan Oblast, a selo in Zotinsky Selsoviet of Petukhovsky District of Kurgan Oblast
Zotino, Nizhny Novgorod Oblast, a village in Zubilikhinsky Selsoviet of Krasnobakovsky District of Nizhny Novgorod Oblast
Zotino, Kormilovsky District, Omsk Oblast, a village in Georgiyevsky Rural Okrug of Kormilovsky District of Omsk Oblast
Zotino, Tyukalinsky District, Omsk Oblast, a village in Atrachinsky Rural Okrug of Tyukalinsky District of Omsk Oblast
Zotino, Perm Krai, a village in Sivinsky District of Perm Krai
Zotino, Udmurt Republic, a village in Erkeshevsky Selsoviet of Balezinsky District of the Udmurt Republic